Clearchus of Soli (Klearkhos ho Soleus) was a Greek philosopher of the 4th–3rd century BCE, belonging to Aristotle's Peripatetic school. He was born in Soli in Cyprus.

He wrote extensively on eastern cultures, and is thought to have traveled to the Bactrian city of Ai-Khanoum (Alexandria on the Oxus) in modern Afghanistan.

Writings
Clearchus wrote extensively around 320 BCE on Oriental cultures, from Israel to Persia to India, and several fragments from him are known. His book "Of Education" (Greek: , Peri paideiās) was cited by Diogenes Laërtius.

Clearchus in particular expressed several theories on the connection between western and eastern religions. In "Of Education", he wrote that "the gymnosophists are descendants of the Magi".

In another text, Josephus the first-century Romano-Jewish scholar claimed that Clearchus has reported a dialogue with Aristotle, where the philosopher states that the Hebrews were descendants of the Indian philosophers:

His works included also:
  (Bioi); a work on the right way of life, in at least eight volumes
  A commentary on Plato's Timaeus
  (Platōnos enkōmion); eulogy to Plato
  (Peri tōn en tē Platōnos Polīteiā mathēmatikōs eirēmenōn); on the mathematical subjects in Plato's Republic
  (Gergithios); a treatise on flattery
  (Peri filiās); on friendship
  (Paroimiai); proverbs
  (Peri griphōn); on riddles
  (Erōtika); a probably historical collection of love-stories with some very odd questions on the subject
  (Peri graphōn); on paintings
  (Perigraphai); ? the reading in Athenaeus is doubtful (XIV 648f)
  (Peri narkēs); on the electric ray
  (Peri tōn enudrōn); on water-animals
  (Peri thīnōn); on sand-wastes
  (Peri skeletōn); an anatomical work
  (Peri upnou); on sleep (genuineness questionable)

There is some question as to whether the work on military tactics cited by Aelianus Tacticus should be ascribed to Clearchus of Soli or Clearchus of Heraclea.

Travels

In the Bactrian city of Ai-Khanoum, near the border with India, Greek verses, brought to city by Clearchus from Delphi, were dedicated to the founder of the city named Kineas. On a Herôon (funerary monument), identified in Greek as the tomb of Kineas (also described as the oikistes (founder) of the Greek settlement) and dated to 300-250 BC, the inscription says:

The precepts were placed by a Greek named Clearchus, thought to be Clearchus of Soli, who had copied them from Delphi:

Clearchus of Soli was a contemporary and compatriot of Stasanor (born in the same city of Soli, in Cyprus), who was a general of Alexander the Great and later satrap of Bactria and Sogdiana.

Notes

Ancient Cypriots
Commentators on Plato
4th-century BC philosophers
Cypriot non-fiction writers
Peripatetic philosophers
Speechwriters
Philosophers and tutors of Alexander the Great
Year of birth unknown
Year of death unknown